Thomas Danneberg (born 2 June 1942) is a German former actor and voice actor. He is best known as Charles Emerson in the 1967 Edgar Wallace film The Blue Hand and for dubbing over the actors Arnold Schwarzenegger, Terence Hill, Sylvester Stallone, John Cleese, Dan Aykroyd, Adriano Celentano, Nick Nolte, John Travolta, Michael York, Rutger Hauer and Dennis Quaid. He has since retired from voice acting because of health reasons.

He has also collaborated with the German trance/techno-band E Nomine on a number of their albums.

Roles

Films 
Codename: Wildgeese – 1985 – Habib
Commando Leopard – 1986 – Jose
 – 1988 – "Crazy Bo" Gustafsson

Television animation 
A Sitch in Time (Rufus 3000)

Original video animation 
Mickey's Twice Upon a Christmas (Blitzen)

Theatrical animation 
Big Hero 6 (Heathcliff)
Brother Bear (Tuke)
Chicken Little (Hollywood Chicken Little)
Igor (Dr. Glickenstein)
Shark Tale (Luca)
Shrek 2 (King Harold)
Shrek Forever After (King Harold)
Shrek the Third (King Harold)
The Fox and the Hound (Adult Tod)
The Wild (Benny)

Video games 
Ankh (Annoying Palace Guard, Mummy, Souvenir Dealer)
Jack Keane (Montgomery)

Dubbing roles (live action) 
Dan Aykroyd
John Cleese
Terence Hill
Dennis Quaid
Arnold Schwarzenegger
Sylvester Stallone
John Travolta
Die Hard with a Vengeance (John McClane)
The Fall Guy (Howie Munson)
Highlander (The Kurgan)
Hulk (David Banner)
Mother, Jugs & Speed (Murdoch)

Audiobooks 
 2007: John Katzenbach: Die Anstalt, The Madman's Tale (together with Simon Jäger), publisher: Argon Verlag,

External links 

German Dubbing Card Index

1942 births
Living people
German male voice actors
German male film actors
Place of birth missing (living people)